Judy Schwiebert is an American politician and educator serving as a member of the Arizona House of Representatives from the 2nd district. Elected in 2020 to the 20th district, she assumed office on January 11, 2021. She ran for reelection in 2022 for the 2nd district, as a result of redistricting.

Early life and education 
Schwiebert was raised in Phoenix, Arizona. She earned a Bachelor of Arts in Education degree in English from Arizona State University and a Master of Arts in Education in library science from the University of Ottawa.

Career 
For 27 years, Schwiebert worked as a teacher in the Glendale Union High School District and Peoria Unified School District. She is the co-founder of Theater Works, a non-profit education organization based in Glendale, Arizona. Schwiebert was elected to the Arizona House of Representatives in 2020. She assumed office on January 11, 2021, succeeding Republican incumbent Anthony Kern.

References 

Living people
Democratic Party members of the Arizona House of Representatives
University of Arizona alumni
University of Ottawa alumni
Women state legislators in Arizona
Educators from Arizona
Politicians from Phoenix, Arizona
21st-century American politicians
21st-century American women politicians
20th-century American educators
20th-century American women educators
21st-century American educators
21st-century American women educators
Year of birth missing (living people)